Bent Christensen Arensøe, formerly known as Bent René Christensen, (born 4 January 1967) is a Danish former professional footballer who played as a striker.

During his active career he earned the nickname "Turbo" for his velocity. He played in a string of clubs, most notably Danish club Brøndby IF, where he scored a combined 116 goals in 208 games and won five Danish championships. He played 26 games and scored eight goals for the Denmark national football team, and was a part of the Danish 1992 European Championship winning side.

Playing career

Club career 
Born in Copenhagen, Christensen started his career with Brønshøj BK in 1985, under manager Ebbe Skovdahl. He moved abroad in the same year, 17 years old, to play for Swiss club Servette FC. With Servette, he won the 1985 Swiss Super League. He wanted away from the club, and was initially loaned out to Danish club Vejle Boldklub in 1987. He moved permanently to Brøndby IF, under Brøndby manager Ebbe Skovdahl, later that year. He was a part of the Brøndby team that won the 1988 and 1989 Danish championships.

In his time for Brøndby, he was Danish league top goalscorer three times, in the 1988 season, 1990 season and 1991 season tournaments. He was part of the Brøndby team who, under manager Morten Olsen, reached the semi-finals of the European 1991 UEFA Cup tournament, and he was sold to German team FC Schalke 04 later that year. The transfer deal was a race for Christensen's signature between Schalke and Eintracht Frankfurt, and was worth DEM 5 million, which made Christensen the most expensive Danish footballer at the time, with a monthly wage of DKK 400,000. He did not find playing success at Schalke, where he scored eight goals in 49 games, and he earned the nickname "Trabi-Bent".

He moved to Greek club Olympiacos for the 1993 season, where he found playing success. In July 1994, he moved on to SD Compostela in Spain. He remained three seasons at Compostela with good success, before moving to Gençlerbirliği in Turkey in 1997. Christensen returned to Brøndby in March 1998, under manager Ebbe Skovdahl, and was a part of Brøndby's 1998 Danish Superliga and 1998 Danish Cup wins. He also took part in Brøndby's campaign in the European 1998–99 UEFA Champions League tournament. After the 1999–00 season, he ended his professional career, and played his last games with childhood club Brønshøj BK in 2000.

International career 
Christensen made his international debut with the Denmark under-19 national team in July 1983. He scored a combined five goals in 28 games for the under-19 and under-17 teams until June 1985, scoring one goal at the 1984 UEFA European Under-19 Football Championship. He made his Danish under-21 debut in October 1986, and scored two goals in six games for the team until September 1987.

He made his senior debut for the Danish national team in the February 1989 friendly match against Malta. He scored six goals in four games in Denmark's UEFA Euro 1992 qualifying campaign. He was selected to represent the Danish national team at the UEFA Euro 1992 in Sweden. Christensen played Denmark's first two games in the tournament without scoring, but was injured and travelled home while the rest of the squad went on to win the tournament. Christensen didn't take part in the Danish public celebrations of the trophy, and did not really feel a part of the winning team. While at Compostela, Christensen played his last national team match in November 1994, against Spain, and ended his national team career after 26 matches and 8 goals.

Coaching career 
In January 2003, he started as head coach of Værløse Boldklub, which he led to the Danish 2nd Division. In October 2005 he was hired as head coach of the Brøndby IF youth team, and in June 2010 he was additionally named coach in charge of special training of attackers for the first team. In 2011, Christensen was named assistant coach in Brøndby.

When Thomas Frank was named new manager of Brøndby IF in June 2013, Christensen succeeded him as manager of the Danish national under-19 football team.

Career highlights

Club statistics 
Total number of goals for Brøndby (1987–1991 and 1998–2000):
 Danish Superliga: 80 goals
 Danish Cup: 16 goals
 UEFA Intertoto Cup: 10 goals
 UEFA Cup/European Cup: 10 goals
 Total score in 208 games: 116 goals

Honours 
 Swiss Super League: 1984–85
 Danish Championship: 1987, 1988, 1990, 1991, 1997–98
 Danish Cup: 1988–89, 1997–98
 European Football Championship: 1992

References

External links 
 Danish national team profile 
 Brøndby IF 1998–2000 profile 
 Danish career statistics (Superliga games since 1991) 
 
 

1967 births
Living people
Association football forwards
Danish men's footballers
Denmark international footballers
Denmark under-21 international footballers
Servette FC players
Vejle Boldklub players
Brøndby IF players
Danish football managers
FC Schalke 04 players
Olympiacos F.C. players
SD Compostela footballers
Gençlerbirliği S.K. footballers
La Liga players
Danish Superliga players
Bundesliga players
Expatriate footballers in Spain
Expatriate footballers in Germany
Expatriate footballers in Greece
Expatriate footballers in Turkey
Expatriate footballers in Switzerland
Danish expatriate men's footballers
UEFA Euro 1992 players
UEFA European Championship-winning players
Brønshøj Boldklub players
Danish expatriate sportspeople in Germany
Danish expatriate sportspeople in Turkey
Danish expatriate sportspeople in Switzerland
Danish expatriate sportspeople in Greece
Danish expatriate sportspeople in Spain
Brøndby IF non-playing staff
Footballers from Copenhagen